The Harecastle railway tunnels are a set of three railway tunnels on the North Staffordshire Railway at Kidsgrove in Staffordshire.

First opened to traffic in 1848 only two years after being authorised, the tunnels were built to carry the North Staffordshire Railway line between Kidsgrove and Tunstall. They were not the first tunnels in the area, having the older Harecastle Canal Tunnels running so close that vibrations from the trains allegedly affected their integrity. The central and southern tunnels have been disused since 1965, following the realignment of the operational railway; this move was taken due to their limited size having made them unsuitable for the installation of overhead electrification apparatus. It was announced during 2013 that the disused Harecastle tunnels, which have continued to be maintained, would be sold to a public body.

History
The construction of the Harecastle railway tunnels was authorised by an Act of Parliament issued in 1846. An alternative route for the tunnels had been considered at one point, but was ultimately discarded, partly due to the objections of a Thomas Kinnersley of Clough Hall but also due to the alignment opted for having gentler gradients. A further benefit of the alignment was that construction could be aided considerably by using shafts driven from the preexisting Harecastle Canal Tunnels.

Accordingly, the North Staffordshire Railway commenced work almost immediately thereafter on boring the tunnels. There were a total of three tunnels built on the alignment between Tunstall and Kidsgrove, commonly referred to as the North, Middle and South tunnels. Each carrying a pair of tracks throughout, the North tunnel was the shortest of the three at only 130 yards, while the Middle had a length of 180 yards and the South tunnel, being the longest, was 1,766 yards in length. The North tunnel was constructed using the traditional cut-and-cover technique, unlike the other two bores. During 1848, construction of the Harecastle railway tunnels was officially completed.

According to railway historian Basil Jeuda, the completed tunnels formed a key link in Britain's national rail system. The arrival of the railway negatively impacted the neighbouring  Canal tunnels. During 1914, the oldest of the two canal tunnels was permanently closed as a consequence of a partial collapse of the bore, the cause allegedly having been vibrations generated by trains traversing the nearby railway tunnels.

During the 1960s, work was underway on the wider electrification of the West Coast Main Line; however, the Harecastle railway tunnels posed a particular challenge. It was decided to open out the North tunnel, which was achieved via a series of flying buttresses that effectively made it a tunnel no longer. In contrast, both the South and Middle tunnels were deemed to be unsuitable for electrification due to their limited size. Instead, it was decided to divert the line away from the tunnels onto a new alignment running to the west, along with the newly built Kidsgrove Tunnel that was bored to carry this diversion. The diversion starts about 300 metres south of Kidsgrove railway station, and rejoined the original line just to the west of Tunstall (roughly where the A527 crosses the line). The last trains to use the original alignment were run during 1965.

During early 2013, it was announced that the British Government had directed the Department of Transport to put the disused tunnels up for sale. It has been stipulated that the tunnels' new owner must be a public body, and that they must continue to receive appropriate maintenance. The southern bore is reportedly mostly flooded due to its drainage being unserviced.

References

Further reading
 Allan C. Baker & Mike G. Fell. "Harecastle's Canal and Railway Tunnels." Lightmoor Press, 2019. .

External links
 1940s 1 inch to 1 mile map
 Ordnance Survey OPENDATA VIEWER map
 Geograph photo of steam train on the diversion

Railway tunnels in England
Tunnels in Staffordshire
Transport in Staffordshire
Tunnels completed in 1848